Sania Mirza and Yaroslava Shvedova were the defending champions, but both opted to play at the London Summer Olympics instead.
Shuko Aoyama and Chang Kai-chen won the title, defeating Irina Falconi and Chanelle Scheepers 7–5, 6–2 in the final.

Seeds

Draw

Draw

References
General

Specific

Citi Open - Women's Doubles